Rogério Sganzerla (4 May 1946 — 9 January 2004) was a Brazilian filmmaker. One of the main names of the cinema marginal underground movement, his most known work is The Red Light Bandit (1968).  Sganzerla was influenced  by Orson Welles, Jean-Luc Godard, and José Mojica Marins, and often used clichés from film noir and pornochanchadas. Irony, narrative subversion and collage were trademarks of his film aesthetics.

Biography 
Sganzerla was born in Joaçaba, in the state of Santa Catarina. During the 1960 decade he wrote for the newspaper O Estado de S. Paulo as film reporter. In 1967 Sganzerla directed his first short film, Documentário. In 1968 he directed his first feature film, O Bandido da Luz Vermelha (The Red Light Bandit)

In 1970 he founded the Bel-Air film company, together with Júlio Bressane. Headed by Sganzerla, the company produced the films Copacabana Mon Amour and Sem essa, aranha (1970). In 1985 Sganzerla directed the docufiction Nem Tudo É Verdade (It's Not All True) about Orson Welles'  arrival to Brazil to film his unfinished documentary It's All True.

Sganzerla died in 2004, of a brain tumor, shortly after finishing his last film O signo do caos.

Filmography

References

External links 
 
 Dossiê Sganzerla at Contracampo Revista de Cinema

1946 births
2004 deaths
Brazilian film directors
Deaths from brain cancer in Brazil